Dart Man was the name given by the media to the person suspected of 53 dart attacks on women during the summer of 1990 in New York City.

Attacks
The first reported incident occurred on June 28, and by July 7, 1990, more than 50 women had been struck by a dart, usually in the buttocks. The victims of attacks by Dart Man all fit a similar profile: light-skinned women attired in business suits or skirts. Witnesses described the attacker as a black man.

Apprehension
In late July, the New York City Police Department apprehended Jerome Wright, a 33-year-old Bronx resident who worked as a messenger of an advertising agency. Wright was identified as Dart Man by three witnesses in a police lineup. During Wright's arraignment, it was revealed that he had a prior criminal conviction in 1988 for selling cocaine and in 1989 for petty larceny.

On August 8, 1990, Wright was granted bail at $1,000, and all the charges against him were reduced to misdemeanors.

References

African-American people
Criminals from New York City
History of New York City
People from the Bronx